The Shanghai–Kunming high-speed railway is a high-speed railway line. It was built in stages and completed on 28 December 2016. It is part of the CRH's system of passenger-dedicated lines, beginning in Shanghai and ending in Kunming, the capital of Yunnan Province. Following a fairly similar route to the older "conventional" Shanghai–Kunming Railway, the Shanghai–Kunming high-speed railway passes through four more provincial capitals, the cities of Hangzhou, Nanchang, Changsha, and Guiyang.

Status 
The entire line is operational. The last section, Guiyang–Kunming, was opened on 28 December 2016. In November 2017, Chinese media reported that traffic safety was endangered due to quality issues with the construction; furthermore, the construction company committed fraud and illegal subcontracting.

Components

References 

High-speed railway lines in China
Rail transport in Shanghai
Rail transport in Zhejiang
Rail transport in Jiangxi
Rail transport in Hunan
Rail transport in Guizhou
Rail transport in Yunnan
Standard gauge railways in China